The office of Development Commissioner for Handicrafts is the national agency which works for the development, promotion and export of Indian handicrafts. The agency comes under the administrative control of Ministry of Textiles, Government of India.

Schemes
 Ambedkar Hastshilp Vikas Yojana 
 Mega Cluster Scheme
 Marketing Support and Services Scheme
 Research and Development Scheme

Demographic profile of artisans in India

References

Ministry of Textiles
Indian government officials
Indian handicrafts